Rodion is a Slavic masculine given name of Greek origin, which is sometimes shortened to Rod. It may refer to
Rodion Amirov, (born 2001), Russian ice hockey player
Rodion Azarkhin (1931–2007), Russian musician
Rodion Cămătaru (born 1958), Romanian association football player
Rodion Davelaar (born 1990), Antillean swimmer
Rod Dyachenko (born 1983), Russian association football player
Rodion Gačanin (born 1963), Croatian association football player and coach
Rodion Kuzmin (1891–1949), Russian mathematician
Rodion Luka (born 1972), Ukrainian yachtsman
Rodion Malinovsky (1898–1967), Soviet military commander 
Rodion Markovits (1888–1948), Austro-Hungarian-born writer, journalist and lawyer
Rodion Romanovich Raskolnikov, the fictional protagonist of Crime and Punishment by Fyodor Dostoyevsky
Rodion Shchedrin (born 1932), Russian composer and pianist

See also
Radion (given name)
Herodion
Rodionov

Masculine given names
Russian masculine given names